Meka'ika is a small coastal town in the Southern Denkalya Subregion, Southern Red Sea Region in Eritrea.

The town borders the Red Sea, with the islands of Fatma and Halib close by.

References 

Southern Red Sea Region
Populated places in Eritrea